Shiv Shankar Mukherjee is an Indian civil servant and was the High Commissioner of India to the United Kingdom  from 2008 to 2009.

He is a 1971  batch officer of the Indian Foreign Service. Before he held the position in the United Kingdom he served as ambassador to Nepal from 2004. Other prior appointments include work as High Commissioner to South Africa, as ambassador to Egypt and as High Commissioner to Namibia.

References

High Commissioners of India to the United Kingdom
Indian Foreign Service officers
Ambassadors of India to Nepal
Delhi University alumni
High Commissioners of India to Namibia